Shinu (born 25 May 1996) is an Indian professional footballer who plays as a defender for South United in the I-League 2nd Division.

Career

Gokulam FC
In January 2017, Shinu joined the new side Gokulam Kerala.

Career statistics

References

1996 births
Living people
Indian footballers
Association football defenders
Gokulam Kerala FC players
Footballers from Kerala